Parvoz Bobojon Ghafurov is football club based in Ghafurov, Tajikistan. The currently play in the top division of the country.

History
Parvoz Bobojon Ghafurov was founded in 2001 as "Aviator Chkalovsk", and was based in the northern Tajik town of Chkalovsk. In 2003 Aviator Chkalovsk participated in the top flight of the Tajik Football, the Tajik League, for the first time, finishing third behind Champions Regar-TadAZ and FK Khujand. The following season Aviator repeated their third place in the league whilst also winning the Tajik Cup for the first time, defeating FK Istaravshan 5–0 in the final.
Prior to the 2005 season, Aviator moved to Ghafurov, were renamed "Parvoz Bobojon Ghafurov" and finished third for the third season in a row. Parvoz's highest league finish came in 2007, when they finished as runners-up to Regar-TadAZ and won the Tajik Cup for the second time, this time defeating Hima Dushanbe 1–0 in the final. 2008 saw Parvoz again finish second behind Regar-TadAZ.

Name history

 2001–2004: Aviator Chkalovsk
 2004     : Aviator Bobojon Ghafurov
 2005–    : Parvoz Bobojon Ghafurov

Domestic history

Honours
Tajik Cup (2) 2004, 2007

External links
  Parvoz Fan Club

References

Football clubs in Tajikistan
Association football clubs established in 2001
2001 establishments in Asia
Sughd Region